Siemens Nixdorf Informationssysteme, AG (SNI) was formed in 1990 by the merger of Nixdorf Computer and the Data Information Services (DIS) division of Siemens.

It functioned as a separate company within Siemens.

It was the largest information technology company in Europe until 1999, when it was split into two: Fujitsu Siemens Computers and Wincor Nixdorf. Wincor Nixdorf took over all banking and retail related business.

Products
SNI sold: 
BS2000 and SINIX operating systems
BS2000 mainframe computers
a number of databases
SNI RISC-based RM-x00 servers
a variety of other hardware and software products (from Personal Computers to SAP R/3).
ComfoDesk – a GUI shell for enterprise users

See also
 Heinz Nixdorf MuseumsForum

References

Defunct computer companies of Germany
Diebold Nixdorf
Siemens
Defunct technology companies of Germany
Computer hardware companies of Germany
Computer companies established in 1990
Computer companies disestablished in 1999
1990 establishments in Germany
1999 disestablishments in Germany